Matanuska-Susitna Borough (often referred to as the Mat-Su Borough) is a borough located in the U.S. state of Alaska. Its borough seat is Palmer, and the largest community is the census-designated place of Knik-Fairview. As of the 2020 census, the borough's population was 107,801,

The borough is part of the Anchorage Metropolitan Statistical Area, along with the municipality of Anchorage on its south.

The Mat-Su Borough is so designated because it contains the entire Matanuska and Susitna Rivers. They empty into Cook Inlet, which is the southern border of the Mat-Su Borough. It is one of the few agricultural areas of Alaska.

Geography

The borough seat is Palmer, and the largest community is the census-designated place of Knik-Fairview, Alaska.

As of the 2020 census, the population was 107,081, up from 88,995 in 2010. It is the fastest growing subdivision in Alaska.

Adjacent boroughs and census areas
 Denali Borough, Alaska - north
 Southeast Fairbanks Census Area, Alaska - northeast
 Copper River Census Area, Alaska - east
 Chugach Census Area, Alaska - east
 Municipality of Anchorage, Alaska - south
 Kenai Peninsula Borough, Alaska - south
 Bethel Census Area, Alaska - west
 Yukon-Koyukuk Census Area, Alaska - west

National protected areas in the borough
 Chugach National Forest (part)
 Denali National Park and Preserve (part)
 Denali Wilderness (part)
 Lake Clark National Park and Preserve (part)
 Lake Clark Wilderness (part)

Demographics

As of the census of 2000, there were 59,322 people, 20,556 households, and 15,046 families residing in the borough.  The population density was 2 people per square mile (1/km2).  There were 27,329 housing units at an average density of 1 per square mile (0/km2).  The racial makeup of the borough was 87.55% White, 0.69% Black or African American, 5.50% Native American, 0.70% Asian, 0.12% Pacific Islander, 0.86% from other races, and 4.57% from two or more races.  2.50% of the population were Hispanic or Latino of any race.

There were 20,556 households, out of which 42.30% had children under the age of 18 living with them, 58.90% were married couples living together, 9.10% had a female householder with no husband present, and 26.80% were non-families. 20.30% of all households were made up of individuals, and 4.10% had someone living alone who was 65 years of age or older.  The average household size was 2.84 and the average family size was 3.29.

In the borough the population was spread out, with 32.20% under the age of 18, 7.40% from 18 to 24, 31.10% from 25 to 44, 23.40% from 45 to 64, and 5.90% who were 65 years of age or older.  The median age was 34 years. For every 100 females, there were 108.20 males.  For every 100 females age 18 and over, there were 108.10 males.

Schools in the borough are administered by the Matanuska-Susitna Borough School District.

Politics and government

Republicans have carried the borough in every election except for 1964.

Edna DeVries is the mayor of the Matanuska-Susitna Borough. The borough has a strong-manager form of government. Mike Brown is the borough manager. Long-time Manager John Duffy retired in 2010.

Sarah Palin was previously the mayor of Wasilla, the largest city in the borough.

Communities

Cities
Houston
Palmer
Wasilla

Census-designated places

Big Lake
Buffalo Soapstone
Butte
Chase
Chickaloon
Eureka Roadhouse
Farm Loop
Fishhook
Gateway
Glacier View
Knik River
Knik-Fairview
Lake Louise
Lazy Mountain
Meadow Lakes
North Lakes
Petersville
Point MacKenzie
Skwentna
South Lakes
Susitna
Susitna North
Sutton-Alpine
Talkeetna
Tanaina
Trapper Creek
Willow

Other locations
Alexander Creek

Cyber attack
In July 2018, the borough's computer systems, including the library and animal shelter, were hit by a ransomware attack, forcing employees to do without computers, using electric typewriters where available. The borough declared a state of emergency and incurred over $2 million in costs. The method is thought to have been a targeted phishing e-mail; data left by the malware indicated Mat-Su was the 210th target attacked.

Gallery

See also

Matanuska-Susitna Valley
List of Airports in the Matanuska-Susitna Borough
Matanuska Formation
Deshka Landing Fire

References

External links

 official government website
 Borough Facebook
 Borough newsroom
Borough map, 2000 census: Alaska Department of Labor
Borough map, 2010 census: Alaska Department of Labor

 
Matanuska
Alaska boroughs
Populated places established in 1964
1964 establishments in Alaska